Dennis Dexter Haysbert (born June 2, 1954) is an American actor. He is known for his roles as baseball player Pedro Cerrano in the Major League film trilogy, Secret Service agent Tim Collin in the political thriller film Absolute Power, Sergeant Major Jonas Blane on the CBS action drama series The Unit, God on the Netflix show Lucifer, and President David Palmer on the first five seasons of 24. He has also appeared in the films Love Field, Heat, Waiting to Exhale, and Far from Heaven, as well as the science fiction series Incorporated.

Early life
Haysbert was born in San Mateo, California, the son of Gladys (née Minor), a homemaker and house cleaner, and Charles Whitney Haysbert Sr., a deputy sheriff and airline security guard. He is the eighth of nine children, having two sisters and six brothers. His parents were from Louisiana. Haysbert was raised Baptist.

Haysbert graduated from San Mateo High School in 1972. After high school, being 6 ft 5 in tall, he was offered athletic scholarships but instead chose to study acting at the American Academy of Dramatic Arts.

Career

Television
Haysbert has been acting in film and television since 1978, starting with a guest role in The White Shadow. His television guest starring roles include Lou Grant, Growing Pains, Laverne & Shirley, The A-Team, Night Court, Dallas, The Incredible Hulk, Magnum, P.I., Buck Rogers in the 25th Century, Duckman and Brooklyn 99. In 1993, he had a featured role in Return to Lonesome Dove as outlaw Cherokee Jack Jackson. In 1999, Haysbert starred with Eric Close in Now and Again, which was cancelled after one season.

In 2001, Haysbert rose to prominence when he was cast in 24 as U.S. Senator David Palmer, who served as the first black U.S. President (in the context of the show) during the second and third seasons. He also returned as a guest star in the last six episodes of season 4 and the first episode of season 5. He was nominated for a Golden Globe and for a Golden Satellite Award in 2002 for this role. Haysbert stated in an interview for the show that the three men he admires most—Jimmy Carter, Bill Clinton, and Colin Powell—collectively embody his idea of what a President should be. Haysbert believes that his playing of David Palmer on 24 helped Barack Obama—whom Haysbert supported—to win the 2008 Democratic presidential nomination.

Haysbert was the first actor to portray DC Comics character Kilowog, a member of the Green Lantern Corps, in a medium outside of comics. He provided the voice of Kilowog on various episodes of Justice League and Justice League Unlimited. On March 4, 2006, Haysbert guest-starred on the Saturday Night Live episode hosted by Natalie Portman as the host of a live-action/animated TV Funhouse cartoon called "Belated Black History Moment." In his role, Haysbert paid homage to fictional short-lived Saturday morning cartoons featuring black characters, such as Ladysmith Black Mambazo in Outer Space. He also portrayed Nelson Mandela in Goodbye Bafana (also released under the name The Color of Freedom). Haysbert portrayed the lead character Jonas Blane in the CBS military action-drama The Unit. He hosted and narrated the Military History Channel presentation of Secrets of Pearl Harbor, which documented his scuba dives with a film team on World War II-era Japanese and American warships in the Pacific Theater. In March 2013, Haysbert narrated the documentary The World According to Dick Cheney on the Showtime television channel. On May 19, 2014, Haysbert also featured in the fifth episode of the fourth season of The Boondocks as Reverend Sturdy Harris. In 2015, Haysbert played Detective John Almond in Backstrom.

Since September 6, 2015, Haysbert has been the opening voice introducing NBC's Meet The Press.

In November 2016, Haysbert began his co-starring role in Incorporated. Set in a dystopian future run by corporations, Haysbert plays Julian, a ruthless security head working for one of the larger corporations. Ben Affleck and Matt Damon are co-executive producers on the series, which was shot in British Columbia, Canada, and airs on Showcase in Canada and Syfy in the U.S.

He has also been cast to play God for the second half of the fifth season of Lucifer.

On August 20, 2021, A&E announced that Haysbert would host a revival of American Justice, replacing long time narrator Bill Kurtis.

Film

In 1989, Haysbert made his first major role as Pedro Cerrano, a voodoo-practicing Cuban refugee baseball player, in Major League. Haysbert followed that up with a role in 1990's Navy SEALs, which also starred Charlie Sheen and Michael Biehn, before moving on to another baseball film, Mr. Baseball with Tom Selleck. In 1991, he also starred in K-9000, where he played a police officer named Nick Sanrio. In 1992, he co-starred with Michelle Pfeiffer in Love Field, a film about a series of events occurring contemporaneously with the assassination and funeral of President John F. Kennedy. In 1994, Haysbert reprised his role as Cerrano in Major League II. This was followed by minor appearances in Waiting to Exhale, Heat, and Absolute Power. In 1998, Haysbert made another appearance as Cerrano in Major League: Back to the Minors. In 1999, Haysbert played a police detective in three films: The Minus Man, The Thirteenth Floor, and Random Hearts. In 2000, Haysbert played the role of Zeke McCall in Love & Basketball.

In 2002, Haysbert played the role of gardener Raymond Deagan in Far From Heaven. He won three awards (Satellite Award, Black Reel Award, and Washington DC Area Film Critics Association Award) for Best Supporting Actor for that role. In 2005, he had a supporting role in Sam Mendes's film, Jarhead. In 2007, Haysbert returned to the big screen to portray Nelson Mandela in Goodbye Bafana and an FBI agent in Breach. In 2012, he voiced General Hologram in Wreck-It Ralph and served as an official judge for the Noor Iranian Film Festival. He replaced the deceased Michael Clark Duncan as Manute in Sin City: A Dame to Kill For (2014). In 2014, Haysbert played the role of Dean Fairbanks in Dear White People and General Lyons Dead Rising: Watchtower.

In December 2018, it was announced that Haysbert was to star in the Netflix psychological thriller Secret Obsession. The film was released on July 18, 2019.

Commercials
Since 2003, Haysbert has appeared as the official spokesman for the Allstate Insurance Company. His commercials typically end with one of the two Allstate Corporation official slogans, either "Are you in good hands?" or "That's Allstate's stand." However, his commercials have combined the two with "That's Allstate's stand. Are you in good hands?" He has also appeared in Spanish-language commercials with the line "Con Allstate, Estás En Buenas Manos." (With Allstate, you're in good hands.) In his role as spokesman for Allstate, Haysbert officiated the coin toss prior to the 2007 Sugar Bowl between LSU and Notre Dame.

In 2008, Haysbert was featured in national television ads to raise public awareness about lending discrimination. The ads were commissioned by the U.S. Department of Housing and Urban Development's Office of Fair Housing and Equal Opportunity. In one of these ads, Haysbert warns consumers about lenders' targeting minorities for inferior loan products.

For the 2006 college football season, Haysbert did voice work for ticket sales promotions for Brigham Young University. He did it as a favor to his younger brother Adam, who played wide receiver at BYU in the early 1980s.

Haysbert also voices the Military Channel's commercials with their official slogan: "The Military Channel. Go Behind the Lines."

Video games
Haysbert has also done voice work for various video games, such as Irving Lambert in Tom Clancy's Splinter Cell: Pandora Tomorrow, the narrator in Call of Duty: Finest Hour and reprising his television role of David Palmer in 24: The Game.

Theater
In June 2010, Haysbert joined the cast of David Mamet's Race on Broadway as character Henry Brown, performing alongside actors Eddie Izzard, Richard Thomas and Afton Williamson. The play ran until August 21, 2010.

Personal life
Haysbert was married to Elena Simms from 1980-1984, and to Lynn Griffith from 1989-2001. They have two children.

Haysbert announced in April 2009 that he was starting a production company. His first project was to be a documentary for HBO about an up-and-coming boxer.

During the 2010 California elections, Haysbert supported Democratic incumbent Barbara Boxer by appearing with her at campaign events and recording radio commercials.

Filmography

Film

Television

Video games

Theatre

References

External links

 Dennis Haysbert's Official Website & DH6 Gear Store
 
 
 
 
 
 

1954 births
Living people
African-American male actors
Allstate
American Academy of Dramatic Arts alumni
American male film actors
American male stage actors
American male television actors
American male voice actors
Male actors from the San Francisco Bay Area
People from San Mateo, California
20th-century American male actors
21st-century American male actors
20th-century African-American people
21st-century African-American people